
This is a list of films with high frame rates. Only films with a native (without motion interpolation) shooting and projection frame rate of 48 or higher, for all or some of its scenes, are included, as are films that received an official post-conversion using technologies such as TrueCut Motion. This is at least double the 24 frames per second (fps) standard used in Hollywood. Several of these films also have versions which are converted and projected at 24 fps.

Films
The following list is sorted by release year. There are only 2 films in 4K 60 fps on Blu-ray.

See also
 Digital Cinema Package

References

High frame rates